Miri-ye Saburi-ye Do (also Romanized as Mīrī-ye Şabūrī-ye Do; also known as Mīrī-ye Şabūrī) is a village in Nehzatabad Rural District, in the Central District of Rudbar-e Jonubi County, Kerman Province, Iran. At the 2006 census, its population was 230, in 40 families.

References 

Populated places in Rudbar-e Jonubi County